Kensington Park is an eastern suburb of Adelaide in the City of Burnside in South Australia. It is bordered by Magill Road to the north, Glynburn Road to the east, Kensington Road to the south, and Gurrs and Shipsters Roads to the west.

It is home to the Regal Theatre (formerly Chelsea Cinema) and all three campuses of Pembroke School.

Notable Resident
Sir Donald Bradman lived in this suburb for 21 years and died there on 25 February 2001.
 Clarrie Grimmett
The Shahin family owners of On the Run (convenience store).

References

Suburbs of Adelaide